, is a dormant stratovolcano in Tottori Prefecture, Japan. It has an elevation of 1,729 metres. This mountain is the highest in the Chūgoku region, and the most important volcano on the Daisen volcanic belt, which is a part of the Southwestern Honshu volcanic arc, where the Philippine Sea Plate is subducting under the Amurian Plate.

Outline
Mount Daisen is a complex volcano, made by repeated volcanic activity over thousands of years. Eruptions in this area started 1.8 million years ago and resulted in Old Daisen some 500,000 years ago. The Mount Daisen of today, New Daisen, resulted from a second group of eruptions which started 50,000 years ago and ended 10,000 years ago in the caldera of Old Daisen. 50,000 years ago, this mountain had a plinian eruption from which volcanic ash can be found as far away as the Tohoku Region of Japan. Daisen is one of the 100 famous mountains in Japan, and also one of the Chūgoku 100 mountains.

History and religion
Mount Daisen, which stands directly on the Sea of Japan, was regarded as one of the most important mountains for Japanese Shugendō religion. According to the Izumo Kokudo Fudoki, completed in 733, it was called Ōkami-take, literally, Mountain of the great god.

Mount Daisen has been called Hōki Fuji and Izumo Fuji, depending on which side of the mountain the viewer is standing on. These names are based on the old Hōki and Izumo provinces.

Halfway up the mountain stands a Buddhist temple, Daisen-ji. This has existed as a centre of worship since the Heian period. It was founded by the Tendai sect in 718.

Climbing the mountain used to be severely prohibited without a selected monk of Daisen-ji, and common people could not access the mountain until the Edo period.

The mountain has also been important to the mountain ascetics of the Shugendō sect. Just above the temple is the Ōgamiyama Jinja, literally, shrine of the mountain of the great god.

Route
After the 2000 Tottori earthquake, some of Mount Daisen's peaks are on the verge of collapse. It is prohibited to ascend the mountain's highest peak, the Kengamine. Climbers are able to access the Misen Peak. The most popular route is from Daisen-ji to the Misen Peak. It takes three hours to reach the summit.

Gallery

See also
 Tourism in Japan
 List of Ultras of Japan
 List of volcanoes in Japan
 List of mountains in Japan

References

 Geographical Survey Institute
 Paul Hunt, Hiking in Japan: An Adventurer's Guide to the Mountain Trails, Tokyo, Kodansha International Ltd., 1988.  and  C0075

External links 
 
 Daisen - Geological Survey of Japan
 Daisen Guide - Houki town

Mountains of Tottori Prefecture
Volcanoes of Honshū
Complex volcanoes
Volcanoes of Tottori Prefecture
Highest points of Japanese national parks
Stratovolcanoes of Japan
Pleistocene stratovolcanoes
Calderas of Honshū